The 1982 Michigan State Spartans football team represented Michigan State University in the 1982 Big Ten Conference football season. In their third season under head coach Muddy Waters, the Spartans compiled a 2–9 overall record (2–7 against Big Ten opponents) and finished in a tie for eighth place in the Big Ten Conference.

Two Spartans were recognized by the Associated Press (AP) and/or the United Press International (UPI) on the 1981 All-Big Ten Conference football team: linebacker Carl Banks (AP-1; UPI-1); and defensive lineman Smiley Creswell (AP-2; UPI-2).

Schedule

Roster

Game summaries

at Miami (FL)

Notre Dame

Iowa

References

Michigan State Spartans
Michigan State Spartans football seasons
Michigan State Spartans football